Hendrick Motorsports is an American professional stock car racing team that currently competes in the NASCAR Cup Series. The team, founded in 1984 by Rick Hendrick, is one of stock car racing's premier organizations. Hendrick Motorsports has won 14 Cup Series owners and drivers championships, three Truck Series owners and drivers titles, and one Xfinity Series drivers crown. The team has amassed 293 NASCAR Cup Series victories, 26 Xfinity Series wins, 26 Truck Series wins, and 7 ARCA Racing Series victories.

Hendrick Motorsports currently fields four full-time Cup Series teams with the Chevrolet Camaro ZL1 1LE, including the No. 5 for Kyle Larson, the No. 9 for Chase Elliott, the No. 24 for William Byron, and the No. 48 for Alex Bowman. The team formerly fielded teams in the now-Xfinity Series before merging its efforts with JR Motorsports. Hendrick Motorsports also fielded several trucks in the Truck Series, most recently for development driver Chase Elliott in 2013. The team has fielded cars in the past for many NASCAR drivers, including Hall of Famers Jeff Gordon, Mark Martin, Dale Earnhardt Jr., Terry Labonte, Darrell Waltrip, and Benny Parsons, 7-time Cup champion Jimmie Johnson, and others such as Geoff Bodine, Tim Richmond, Ricky Rudd, Ken Schrader, Ricky Craven, Jerry Nadeau, Joe Nemechek, Kyle Busch, Casey Mears, and Kasey Kahne.

Cup Series
In the NASCAR Cup Series, which has been sponsored by Winston, Nextel, Sprint, and Monster Energy during the existence of Hendrick Motorsports, the team has won 293 races and 14 championships. The team has won at nearly every track on which it has competed, with the exception of Kentucky Speedway, Indianapolis Road Course, World Wide Technology Raceway, and the Bristol dirt configuration. It has won at least one race each year since its inception 1984, with the exception of 1985. In 2007, Hendrick set a team record for wins in a single season, winning 18 of 36 races. In 2021, Hendrick Motorsports eclipsed Petty Enterprises (268) in Cup Series wins for a single organization.

Cup Series wins

. – Hendrick won driver's championship

Non-points exhibition race wins

Wins by driver
Twenty drivers have won at least one points race for Hendrick Motorsports in the Cup Series. Since Hendrick now has 293 wins, that total is now . Benny Parsons and Ricky Craven both won an exhibition race while driving for Hendrick but never won a points race.

Wins by track
Hendrick has won on 31 of the 35 tracks on which it has competed in the Cup Series, the exceptions being Kentucky Speedway, Indianapolis Road Course, World Wide Technology Raceway, and the Bristol dirt configuration. This includes the final race at Nashville Fairgrounds Speedway in 1984, the inaugural Brickyard 400 at Indianapolis Motor Speedway in 1994, the final race at North Wilkesboro Speedway in 1996, the first race at California Speedway (now Auto Club Speedway) in 1997, and the first race at Kansas Speedway in 2001. Hendrick also won the inaugural race held on the Daytona Road Course in 2020, the first race at Circuit of the Americas in 2021, the first race at Nashville Superspeedway in 2021, and the return to Road America in 2021.

Wins by season
Since its inception in 1984, Hendrick Motorsports has won at least one race every season except 1985. In 2007, Hendrick accounted for 18 wins, which was half of the total number of points races (36). In 2021, Hendrick won 17 points races, as well as the All-Star Race.

. – Hendrick won driver's championship

Xfinity Series
Rick Hendrick's first NASCAR win came in 1983 in the then-Sportsman Series at Charlotte Motor Speedway with Dale Earnhardt driving. Hendrick had purchased a stake in the team with Robert Gee as the primary owner.

Hendrick Motorsports fielded entries in the renamed Busch Series from 1984 to 1990, and again from 2000 to 2007. In 2003, Ricky Hendrick was listed as the primary owner of the No. 5, which Brian Vickers drove to three victories and the 2003 series championship. Following the conclusion of the 2007 season, Hendrick and JR Motorsports (owned by Dale Earnhardt Jr.) officially combined Xfinity Series operations. The No. 5 Chevrolet began running full-time under the JR Motorsports banner in 2008, and the team received engines and technical support from Hendrick. With the merger, Rick Hendrick became a part owner in the team. Hendrick Motorsports returned to the series in 2009 to field the No. 80 for Tony Stewart at Daytona, which Stewart drove to Hendrick's 26th and final victory in the series.

Xfinity Series wins

. – Hendrick won driver's championship

Wins by driver

Wins by track
Hendrick won on 14 different tracks in the series, with JG Motorsports winning at Homestead–Miami Speedway in 2000 with Rick Hendrick as part owner. The team won four times apiece at Charlotte Motor Speedway and Daytona International Speedway.

Truck Series
Hendrick Motorsports fielded full time entries in the NASCAR Truck Series from the inaugural season in 1995 to the 2001 season, winning a total of 26 races. Terry Labonte won the first race for the organization at Richmond. Jack Sprague in the No. 24 won 23 races and 3 series championships (1997, 1999, 2001) with the team, while Ricky Hendrick added a win in 2001 at Kansas. Hendrick returned to fielding a truck part-time in 2013 for Chase Elliott, with Elliott scoring a win driving the No. 94 truck.

Truck Series wins

. – Hendrick won driver's championship

Wins by track
Hendrick won on 17 different tracks in the truck series, including winning at Richmond and Phoenix three times.

ARCA Series
In 2003, Hendrick fielded Kyle Busch in the ARCA RE/MAX Series for seven races. Busch drove the No. 87 Ditech.com Chevrolet to three poles and two wins. Busch ran the 2004 season opener at Daytona, winning the race after starting second.

Later in 2004, development drivers Blake Feese, Boston Reid, and Kyle Krisiloff ran a combined ten races in ARCA in the No. 5, No. 6, and No. 7 cars fielded by Bobby Gerhart Racing under the Hendrick Motorsports banner. Feese scored a win at Nashville, while Krisiloff scored a victory at Chicagoland Speedway. Later that season, Feese ran a single race in the No. 94 Carquest Auto Parts Chevrolet out of the Hendrick stable at Talladega, scoring another victory.

In 2013, Chase Elliott won at Pocono Raceway driving for his father Bill in a car fielded out of the Hendrick stable.

ARCA Series wins

All-time statistics
As of 2/16/22 – Includes NASCAR's Cup Series, Xfinity Series, Truck Series, and ARCA Series races
 Starts: 5,069* 
 Cup Series: 4,417; Xfinity Series: 373; Truck Series: 225; ARCA Series: 54
 Races Completed: 1,777
 Cup Series: 1,273; Xfinity Series: 271; Truck Series: 180; ARCA Series: 53
 Wins: 339
 Cup Series: 280; Xfinity Series: 26; Truck Series: 26; ARCA Series: 7
 Poles: 299 
 Cup Series: 232; Xfinity Series: 37; Truck Series: 22; ARCA Series: 8
 Top 5s: 1,410* 
 Cup Series: 1,156; Xfinity Series: 118; Truck Series: 115; ARCA Series: 21
 Top 10s: 2,353* 
 Cup Series: 1,983; Xfinity Series: 173; Truck Series: 163; ARCA Series: 34
 Championships: 18
 Cup Series: 14; Xfinity Series: 1; Truck Series: 3; ARCA Series: 0
* – includes results by multiple teams; sometimes as many as 4 or 5 teams per race

See also
 List of all-time NASCAR Cup Series winners
 List of NASCAR race wins by Petty Enterprises
 List of NASCAR race wins by Joe Gibbs Racing
 List of NASCAR race wins by Kyle Busch
 List of NASCAR race wins by Jeff Gordon
 List of NASCAR race wins by Jimmie Johnson

Notes

References

Hendrick Motorsports
NASCAR race wins
NASCAR race wins
NASCAR race wins
NASCAR race wins
NASCAR race wins
Hendrick Motorsports race wins